Meretrix is a genus of edible saltwater clams, marine bivalve molluscs in the family Veneridae, the Venus clams. They appeared in the fossil record in the Cenomanian age.

Species 
Species in the genus Meretrix include:
 Meretrix lamarckii
 Meretrix meretrix
 Meretrix lusoria
 Meretrix lyrata
 †Meretrix chalcedonica, early Danian Lefipán Formation, Cañadón Asfalto Basin, Argentina
 †Meretrix dalli, Paleocene Martinez Formation of California
 †Meretrix faba, Cenomanian Khatiyah Formation of the United Arab Emirates
 †Meretrix hikoshimensis, Oligocene Ashiya Group of Japan
 †Meretrix hornii, Paleocene to Eocene California
 †Meretrix indica, Paleocene Hangu Shales of Pakistan
 †Meretrix negritosensis, Miocene Zorritos Formation of Peru
 †Meretrix nuttalliopsis, Eocene Boca de Serpiente Formation of Trinidad and Tobago
 †Meretrix persica, Miocene of Iran and India
 †Meretrix shantii, Eocene Umm al-Rua'us Formation of Saudi Arabia
 †Meretrix stantoni, Paleocene California
 †Meretrix subimpressa, Eocene Trinidad and Tobago and Maryland
 †Meretrix uvasana, Paleocene to Eocene California

References

Bibliography

Further reading 
 Reid, Shannon (2003). OBIS Indo-Pacific Molluscan Database, Academy of Natural Sciences.

Veneridae
Bivalve genera
Molluscs of the Atlantic Ocean
Molluscs of the Pacific Ocean
Molluscs described in 1799
Taxa named by Jean-Baptiste Lamarck
Extant Cenomanian first appearances